Kalamassery  is a station of Kochi Metro. The station is located between Muttom and Cochin University, in the municipality of Kalamassery.

It was inaugurated by the Prime Minister of India Narendra Modi on 17 June and opened for public on 19 June 2017 as a part of the first stretch of the metro system, between Aluva and Palarivattom.

References

Kochi Metro stations
Railway stations in India opened in 2017